Louis XIV was a king of France who reigned 1643–1715.

Louis XIV or Louis Quatorze  may also refer to:

Style
 Louis XIV style, of architecture and design

Art, entertainment, and media
 Louis XIV (album), 2003 release by the band Louis XIV
 Louis XIV (band), rock band from San Diego, California; formed in 2003
 Louis XIV (board game), 2005 game
 "Louis Quatorze", a song by Bow Wow Wow from the EP The Last of the Mohicans

Ships
 Louis XIV (1854 ship) - French 19th-century ship of the line

Sport
Louis Quatorze (horse), a racing horse